Vervant is a commune in the Charente-Maritime department in southwestern France.

Geography
The village lies on the left bank of the Boutonne, which forms all of the commune's western border.

Population

See also
Communes of the Charente-Maritime department

References

Communes of Charente-Maritime